CIBC is the Canadian Imperial Bank of Commerce.

CIBC may also refer to:

Finance
 Canadian Imperial Bank of Commerce:
 CIBC Argosy Merchant Funds, now known as Trimaran Capital Partners
 CIBC FirstCaribbean International Bank
 CIBC Mellon
 CIBC Oppenheimer
 CIBC Retail Markets
 CIBC Wealth Management
 CIBC World Markets
 CIBC Wood Gundy
 CIBC Building:
 20 Exchange Place, New York City, has been known by many names, including CIBC Building, New York 
 Bank of Commerce (Halifax),  CIBC Building, in Nova Scotia, Canada
 Bank of Commerce Building, Windsor,  CIBC Building, in Ontario, Canada
 CIBC 750 Lawrence in Toronto, Canada
 Old Canadian Bank of Commerce Building, Montreal was CIBC's main office in Montreal prior to the move to Tour CIBC
 La Tour CIBC,  CIBC Tower and CIBC Building, in Montreal, Canada

Radio stations
CIBC-FM 98.1, a radio station in Cowessess, Saskatchewan, Canada
CIRX-FM 94.3, a radio station in Prince George, British Columbia, Canada that previously held the CIBC-FM call sign

Religion
Church of India, Burma and Ceylon (CIBC)